Kyšice is a municipality and village in Kladno District in the Central Bohemian Region of the Czech Republic. It has about 600 inhabitants.

Geography
It lies in the Křivoklát Highlands, in an agricultural landscape. There are town ponds in the territory.

History
The first written mention of Kyšice is from 1316. The village was founded near a fortress that allegedly existed as early as 1249. It was owned by various lower noblemen. In the 17th century, it became part of the Červený Újezd estate and shared its owners and destiny.

Sights
The main landmark of Kyšice is the Chapel of Saint Florian from 1863. Next to the chapel is a crucifix from 1888.

References

External links

Villages in Kladno District